Václav Krecl (born 22 July 1889, date of death unknown) was a Czechoslovak sports shooter. He competed in the 50 m pistol event at the 1936 Summer Olympics.

References

1889 births
Year of death missing
Czechoslovak male sport shooters
Olympic shooters of Czechoslovakia
Shooters at the 1936 Summer Olympics
Place of birth missing